A crisis hotline is a phone number people can call to get immediate emergency telephone counseling, usually by trained volunteers. The first such service was founded in England in 1951 and such hotlines have existed in most major cities of the English speaking world at least since the mid-1970s. Initially set up to help those contemplating suicide, many have expanded their mandate to deal more generally with emotional crises. Similar hotlines operate to help people in other circumstances, including rape, bullying, self-harm, runaway children, human trafficking, and people who identify as LGBT or intersex. Despite crisis hotlines being common, their effectiveness in reducing suicides is unclear.

Effectiveness
Even though crisis hotlines are common, they have not been well studied for efficacy. One study found that people's thoughts of suicide decreased during a call to a crisis line, and were lessened for several weeks after their call. Some callers frequently call crisis helplines, which can take up time from those with more immediate crises.

History

Such services began in 1953, when Chad Varah, an English vicar, founded The Samaritans service, which soon established branches throughout the United Kingdom. The first Samaritans branch in the United States was established in Boston in 1974. In addition to Boston, there are currently Samaritan branches in Falmouth, Massachusetts (serving the Cape Cod and Islands area), the Merrimack Valley, and the Fall River/New Bedford area. Outside of Massachusetts, there are branches in New York City, Providence, Hartford, Albany, and Keene, New Hampshire.

In the United States, the Los Angeles Suicide Prevention Center was founded in 1958 and was the first in the country to provide a 24-hour suicide prevention crisis line and use community volunteers in providing hotline service. San Francisco Suicide Prevention started a hotline named "Call Bruce" in 1962. A similar service, Lifeline, was established in Australia in 1963.

Another service, the volunteer-run crisis helpline Lifelink Samaritans Tas. Inc, originally called Launceston Lifelink, was established in 1968 by concerned citizens of Launceston, Tasmania, who decided to create a phone service based on the principles of The Samaritans. The rationale was that people often become suicidal because they cannot discuss their emotional pain with family and friends.

This service provides emotional support 24 hours a day to people throughout Tasmania and does not have any religious affiliations. The organization is a member of Befrienders Worldwide and has a "twinning" relationship with Northampton Samaritans in the UK. Lifelink Samaritans is the oldest telephone befriending service in Tasmania and the fourth oldest in Australia and receives at least 5,000 calls a year. In December 2018 Lifelink Samaritans celebrated 50 years of service.

Telephone counseling 

Telephone emotional support and crisis hotlines provide a similar telephone support service, and both usually accept crisis and non-crisis calls. In the United States, many college campuses have established telephone counseling lines serviced by volunteers. These hotlines serve callers in crisis, but also serve to provide a listening ear for people who "just need to talk". Typically, hotlines are staffed by trained professionals, and are not intended to replace professional, long-term counseling services. They are rather intended to carry callers through an immediate situation. Such hotlines exist at the University of Maryland, the University of Minnesota, Tufts University, Columbia University, Cornell University, Drexel University, Caldwell University, and Texas A&M University.

The term "emotional support helpline" is sometimes used – which does not imply crisis or counseling, and can include email and text messaging. Such services have allowed for the wider dissemination of resources for people facing mental health crises.

With developments in mobile telephony, the use of text or SMS (short message service) has been utilized by counseling services. Youthline, a youth-oriented crisis helpline in New Zealand, began providing a text messaging counseling support line in 2004.

Contact details

The Volunteer Emotional Support Helplines (VESH) represents 1200 member centres in 61 countries. It has been formed by:

 Befrienders Worldwide (maintained by the Samaritans UK)
 IFOTES – International Federation of Telephone Emergency Services
 Lifeline International

See also
 Hotline
 List of counseling topics
 Telephone counseling 
Crisis Hotline: Veterans Press 1 (2013 documentary film)
 
 Harry Marsh Warren#Save-a-Life League

References

Telephone numbers
Suicide prevention

Telecommunications-related introductions in 1953